Dichagyris forcipula is a moth of the family Noctuidae. It is found from central and southern Europe and Algeria, east to the Caucasus, Turkey, Syria, Lebanon, Iraq and Iran.

Description
Warren (1914) states E. forcipula Schiff. (= denticulosa Esp.) (7f). Forewing dull brown; stigmata outlined in black ; the round orbicular and the reniform with whitish rings: subterminal line formed of ochreous points and black wedge-shaped markings: hindwing pale brownish, with whitish fringe. Occurs throughout the South of Europe and in western Asia; - the ab. bornicensis Fuchs is a more unicolorous form, with obscure markings and ab. nigrescens Hofm. (7f), as its name implies, is blackish and larger

Subspecies
Dichagyris forcipula amasicola (Ukraine, southern Russia)
Dichagyris forcipula amasina (Turkey, Turkmenistan)
Dichagyris forcipula bornicensis (Germany)
Dichagyris forcipula forcipula (France, Italy, Austria, Switzerland, Poland, Czech Republic, Slovakia, Slovenia, former Yugoslavia, Hungary, Romania, Moldova, Ukraine, central and eastern Russia)
Dichagyris forcipula gueddelanea (Spain, Algeria)
Dichagyris forcipula helladica (Albania, Bulgaria, Macedonia, Greece)
Dichagyris forcipula lithargyrula (mainland Italy, Sicily)

References

External links
Lepiforum.de

forcipula
Moths of Europe
Moths of Africa
Moths of Asia
Moths described in 1775